This is a list of some of the regions of Indonesia. Many regions are defined in law or regulations by the central government. At different times of Indonesia's history, the nation has been designated as having regions that do not necessarily correlate to the current administrative or physical geography of the territory of the nation.

Geographical units

According to ISO 3166-2:ID, Indonesia is divided into seven geographical units, with each unit consisting of major islands or an island group. These geographical units are as follows:

Eastern Indonesia and Western Indonesia 
During the last stages of the Dutch colonial era, the area east of Java and Kalimantan was known as the Great East and later known as Eastern Indonesia. On 24 December 1946, the State of East Indonesia was formed covering the same area (excluding Western New Guinea). It was a component of the United States of Indonesia, and was dissolved into the unitary Republic of Indonesia in 17 August 1950. Currently, Eastern Indonesia consists of 17 provinces: Bali, East Nusa Tenggara, West Nusa Tenggara, Central Sulawesi, Gorontalo, North Sulawesi, South Sulawesi, Southeast Sulawesi, West Sulawesi, Maluku, North Maluku, Central Papua, Highland Papua, Papua, South Papua, Southwest Papua, and West Papua. Meanwhile, the region comprising the other 21 provinces in Sumatra, Java, and Kalimantan is known as Western Indonesia.

Development regions
According to the National Development Planning Agency, Indonesia is divided into four main development regions, with each being led by the major cities of Medan, Jakarta, Surabaya, and Makassar.

See also

 List of regions of Vietnam
 Regions of Thailand
 Subdivisions of Indonesia

Notes

References

 

Geography of Indonesia
Regions of Asia
Subdivisions of Indonesia